Boxer is a 2015 Indian Kannada-language romantic action drama film written and directed by Preetham Gubbi and produced by Jayanna - Bhogendra. It stars Dhananjay and Kruthika Jayakumar. The music is composed by V. Harikrishna. The film released on 20 November 2015.

Plot 
Raja is a former-moneylender turned kickboxer who uses his boxing skills to earn money for the people who places a bet on him, and also works as a guard in a mall. One night, Raja meets a blind girl named Lakshmi, where soon they begin to have a chat and become interested in each other. During a boxing match, Raja realizes that he has to regain Rani's eyesight and meets his rival, who tells him about an illegal kickboxing match in Bangkok. Raja admits Lakshmi to an eyecare and heads to Bangkok and bets on a gangster, where he wins the fight. However, Raja is stabbed by the gangster's men, who wants to retrieve the money and leads him to severe spinal injury. After regaining her eyesight, Lakshmi is disappointed upon not seeing Raja and thinks he has abandoned her. 6 months later, Lakshmi is working at the same hospital as a physiotherapist, where Raja is getting treated but doesn't recognize him. Raja too doesn't reveal his identity to Lakshmi, because of his paralytic condition. On being able to walk with crutches, Raja walks away with a heavy heart and visits the place were they both used to spend time together. However, Lakshmi soon recognizes Raja through a marble which she had given to him, where she reaches the same spot and they finally reunite.

Cast

 Dhananjay as Raja
 Kruthika Jayakumar as Lakshmi
 Rangayana Raghu
 Charandeep
 Sumithra
 Shiva Pradeep
Anil Kumar 
Ramesh Bhat 
Aravind Rao 
Prakash Shenoy 
Pragathi Gowda 
Rockline Sudhakar 
Shiva manju

Production
The film was directed by Preetham Gubbi and produced by the duo Jayanna-Bhogendra. Dhananjay played the lead role. The actor had to take kickboxing training. Kruthika Jayakumar was cast after appearing in the Telugu film Drushyam as the daughter of Venkatesh's character. His regular associate V. Harikrishna composed the music. Preetha was tasked with cinematography.

Soundtrack
The soundtrack is composed by V. Harikrishna.

Track listing

References

External links 

2015 films
2015 romantic drama films
Indian romantic drama films
Indian romantic action films
Films scored by V. Harikrishna
2010s Kannada-language films
Indian remakes of South Korean films
Indian boxing films
Films directed by Preetham Gubbi